Altrincham Grammar School for Boys is a boys' grammar school in Altrincham, Greater Manchester, England.

Admissions
The school is a fully selective non-fee paying grammar school with admission via an entrance exam. Its previous status as a foundation school allowed for a degree of independence from the local education authority, until in 2011, under the government's education reforms, it attained Academy status.

History

The school was founded as Altrincham County High School for Boys (ACHS) in 1912 as a result of the Balfour Education Act, to provide secondary education (partly fee-paying) for an area which stretched from Sale to Knutsford.

It opened with 57 pupils and 3 staff (Headmaster, Deputy and one secretary), housed in the red brick building which still forms the central block of the school today. The south wing and the assembly hall were added in 1938 and the science block, gymnasium and workshops in 1964.

In 1974, the school passed from the control of Cheshire County Council to the newly formed Trafford Metropolitan Borough Council. It remained under Trafford's control until 1996 when it became a grant-maintained school. In 1999, it evolved into a foundation school, when grant-maintained school status was abolished.

In September 2003, the Department for Education and Skills (DfES) awarded the school specialist school status as a Language College.

Recent  additions include new blocks for art and design, new ICT suites, the new Stamford Hall canteen, a food technology room, and The Grammar gym.

In October 2013, a new physics centre was opened by the physicist Brian Cox, housing six laboratories, a staff room and a large preparation room.

As of January 2021, the school completed a new building with an additional 9 classrooms, a new library, extra toilets and a small staff room. It is aimed to allow the school to increase their pupil intake per year.

Notable former pupils

 Paul Allott – former Lancashire and England cricketer and currently Director of Cricket at Lancashire
 Roger Ashton-Griffiths – film actor
 Alan Barnes – jazz musician
 Sir Graham Brady – Conservative MP for Altrincham and Sale West and Chairman of the 1922 Committee
 Ian Brown – solo artist and lead singer of the indie rock band The Stone Roses
 Ewan Clarkson - author
 Nick Cohen – journalist and author
 Ashley Taylor Dawson – Hollyoaks actor
 Mark Foster – record-producer and DJ
 Ronald Gow – dramatist, who returned to the school to teach in the 1920s
 Prof Ian Hargreaves, Editor of The Independent from 1994 to 1996, and the New Statesman from 1996–8
 John Hopkins – conductor of the BBC Northern Orchestra from 1952 to 1957, founder of the New Zealand Youth Orchestra and Director of Music at the Australian Broadcasting Commission 1963–73
 Steve Jackson – Co-founder of Games Workshop and Lionhead
 Ian Livingstone – Executive Chairman of Eidos Interactive, co-founder of Games Workshop and publisher of Tomb Raider and Lara Croft
 Prof John Morrill, Professor of British and Irish History at the University of Cambridge
 John Squire – Lead guitarist of the indie rock band The Stone Roses
Brendan Creed - Great Britain and England field hockey player
 Simon Wolstencroft - Rock drummer with The Fall. He also played with early incarnations of The Smiths and The Stone Roses.

Former teachers
 Fred Talbot, weather forecaster (taught biology; convicted of indecent assault against two boys at the school)

The Old Altrinchamians' Association
The Old Altrinchamians' Association is a former pupils' society with golf, football and cricket sections. The Association also holds an Annual Reunion Dinner and publishes an annual newsletter.

Feeder schools
Most of the schools in the local area enter their boys into the 11+ exams. The school does have a catchment area where a boy living very close by can have a good chance. The priority catchment area is defined as the Postal addresses of WA13/WA14/WA15/M33 and M23 which lie within the Trafford Local Authority. However some students travel all the way from Warrington and Stockport and thus commute to and from school. Boys can also use the local Hale Railway Station or Altrincham Interchange, which are very close to the school.

References

External links
 
 Old Altrinchamians' Website

Educational institutions established in 1912
Boys' schools in Greater Manchester
Grammar schools in Trafford
1912 establishments in England
Altrincham
Academies in Trafford